The 2022–23 Campeonato de Portugal will be the tenth season of Portuguese football's renovated fourth-tier league, since the merging of the Segunda Divisão and Terceira Divisão in 2013, and the seventh season under the current Campeonato de Portugal title. After the creation of Liga 3, the new third-tier league in 2021, this will be the second season of Campeonato Portugal as the fourth-tier league in Portuguese football league system, the 25th overall at that level.

This edition will be contested by 56 clubs: 4 clubs relegated from 2021–22 Liga 3, 21 clubs promoted by 2021–22 District Championships and 31 clubs from the 2021–22 Campeonato de Portugal.

Teams

Group stage

Serie A 
<onlyinclude>

Serie B 
<onlyinclude>

Serie C 
<onlyinclude>

Serie D 
<onlyinclude>

References

Campeonato Nacional de Seniores seasons
4
Por
Portugal